The Kissing Booth 3 is a 2021 American teen romantic comedy film directed by Vince Marcello and written by Marcello and Jay Arnold. The third and final installment in The Kissing Booth trilogy based on Beth Reekles' novel of the same name (after The Kissing Booth and The Kissing Booth 2), the film stars Joey King, Joel Courtney, Jacob Elordi, Taylor Zakhar Perez, Maisie Richardson-Sellers, Meganne Young and Molly Ringwald.

The film was released on Netflix on August 11, 2021. The film, like its predecessors, was met with negative reviews from critics.

Plot
After a post-graduation road trip, Elle still hasn't decided between going to Berkeley or Harvard – although Noah is already looking for an off-campus apartment for them. When Noah and Lee's parents announce they're selling the beach house where they all spent their childhoods, Elle, Noah, Lee, and Lee's girlfriend, Rachel, spend the summer there to help prepare for the sale.

Lee shows Rachel his plans for them to see each other on holidays while going to colleges across the country from each other, while Elle is suddenly faced with a Berkeley deadline. Choosing to go to Harvard with Noah upsets Lee, so Elle promises to make it up to him by spending the summer doing their beach bucket list.

Noah's friend Chloe – whom Elle once thought Noah was having an affair with – arrives at the beach house while Marco – whom Elle kissed – gets a job in the area. During a day at the waterpark, Noah and Marco clash, prompting Noah to call Elle naive for not seeing Marco still has feelings for her. Tensions escalate when Elle struggles to divide her time between Lee and Noah. Simultaneously, Elle struggles with accepting her father's new girlfriend, Linda, also a friend of her late mom, fearing that she'll replace her.

Encouraged by Chloe, who is coping with her parents' divorce, to talk to Elle, Noah makes up with Elle. Marco shows up at the Fourth of July party where he again fights with Noah and punches him, but he refuses to retaliate. Marco admits to Elle he does still have feelings for her, but she rejects him. That night, Elle fights with her father over Linda, accusing him of only dating her for his own pride; in response, he angrily recounts the sacrifices he has made for her and her brother Brad and that she is not the only person who deserves to be loved.

Unaware that Noah saw her acceptance letter to Berkeley, Elle goes to find him at their spot. Worried she's only going to Harvard for him and that she will regret it, Noah breaks up with her. Heartbroken, Elle misses a bucket list with Lee to play Dance Dance Revolution. Arguing, Lee tells her that he's never mattered to her compared to Noah, while she tells him to grow up and that all of her decisions this summer have been about trying to make everybody happy. Noah and Lee's mother tells Elle she should start thinking about what she wants to do and choose a college based on that. Chloe and Elle talk about Noah while saying goodbye, with Rachel eavesdropping on their conversation. Having seen the issues Elle and Noah's relationship had, Rachel breaks up with Lee, though she hopes they will someday reunite.

Acknowledging how happy her brother is around her, Elle eventually understands and accepts Linda, reconciling with her father. Marco apologizes to her and they say their farewells amicably before she makes up with Lee. She's realized that she's spent so long maintaining her relationships with Noah and Lee that she hasn't worked out what makes her happy. Elle applies to University of Southern California to study game design. Inspired by her, Noah and Lee's mom decides not to sell the beach house.

Six years later, Elle is developing her own game. She and Lee remain close friends, visiting the fated Kissing Booth at the Charity Fair and Carnival. Additionally, Lee and Rachel got back together and engaged after college. Sometime later, Elle sees Noah for (presumably) the first time since their breakup, where he reveals he has job offers at law firms in LA and New York. Noah suggests going on a motorcycle ride when he's back in town and Elle agrees. They part ways, but not before looking back at each other.

Elle and Noah ride down the coastline in California on their motorcycles, laughing and having fun.

Cast

 Joey King as Elle Evans
 Joel Courtney as Lee Flynn
 Jacob Elordi as Noah Flynn
 Taylor Zakhar Perez as Marco Valentin Peña
 Maisie Richardson-Sellers as Chloe Winthrop
 Meganne Young as Rachel
 Molly Ringwald as Mrs. Flynn
 Stephen Jennings as Mike Evans
 Chloe Williams as Joni Evans
 Morné Visser as Mr. Flynn
 Bianca Bosch as Olivia
 Zandile Madliwa as Gwyneth
 Camilla Wolfson as Mia 
 Carson White as Brad Evans
 Judd Krok as Ollie
 Frances Sholto-Douglas as Vivian
 Evan Hengst as Miles
 Sanda Shandu as Randy
 Hilton Pelser as Barry
 Trent Rowe as Melvin
 Michelle Allen as Heather
 Joshua Eddy as Tuppen
 Nathan Lynn as Cameron
 Byron Langley as Warren
 Cameron Scott as Ashton
 Bianca Amato as Linda
 Daneel Van Der Walt as May

Production
In July 2020, it was announced the third film had been secretly shot back-to-back with the second film in South Africa in 2019, with King, Elordi, Courtney, Perez, Richardson-Sellers and Young all reprising their roles. Marcello again directs from a screenplay he wrote alongside Jay Arnold.

Release 
The Kissing Booth 3 was released on August 11, 2021 on Netflix.

Reception 

The New York Times'''s Natalia Winkleman called The Kissing Booth 3 "a fitting, if bland finale." Kate Erbland from IndieWire gave the movie a grade of D+, criticizing the movie's characters and direction. She wrote: "King continues to breathe life into Elle, even when she's making ludicrous, immature decisions, while Elordi is reduced to looking mad and Courtney is saddled with some serious crying jags." She wrote that the series as a whole "could deliver a more adult, honest look at teenage lives, but it prefers to pull way'' back into chaste, wholly immature territory." Monica Castillo of RogerEbert.com gave the film 1.5/4 stars, writing: "To Marcello and co-writer Jay S. Arnold's credit, there are a handful of surprises that defy some of the more expected youthful rom-com tropes. But the rest is a lot of the same teenage romantic tribulations we've seen before."

Peter Debruge of Variety wrote: "there's plenty of fan service ... but also a late-arriving sense of identity that gives this junk-food sequel just enough nutritional value to help its young audiences reconsider how to determine their own post-high school priorities."

References

External links
 
 

2021 films
2021 romantic comedy films
American romantic comedy-drama films
American sequel films
American teen comedy-drama films
2020s English-language films
Films based on British novels
Films based on young adult literature
Films set in Los Angeles
Films shot in Los Angeles
Films shot in South Africa
English-language Netflix original films
Films directed by Vince Marcello
2020s American films